Ashong Ashyui (Jankasa) is a village community in Jei District of Zangon Kataf Local Government Area, southern Kaduna state in the Middle Belt region of Nigeria. The postal code for the village is 802141. The area has an altitude of about 2,798 feet or 852 meters and a population of about 7,837. The nearest airport to the community is the Yakubu Gowon Airport, Jos.

Settlements
 Before 2017, it used to be a district of its own. However, it was later merged with Jei (Unguwar Gaya) district. Among the settlements in this district were:
 Apyia Gbaza
 Apyinzwang
 Akputuut
 Ashong Ashyui
 Atyecarak (Attachirak, Kacecere)
 Awak
 Makarau
 Manchong
 Manyi Aminyam
 Manyi Ashyui
 Manta Ason
 Nok Ashyui (also Magata, and Afan Tsaai)

Notable people
 Lt. Col. Musa Bityong (late), military officer
 Maj. Gen. Zamani Lekwot (rtd.), military officer

Note
 Achi, B.; Bitiyonɡ, Y. A.; Bunɡwon, A. D.; Baba, M. Y.; Jim, L. K. N.; Kazah-Toure, M.; Philips, J. E. "A Short History of the Atyap" (2019). Zaria: Tamaza Publishinɡ Co. Ltd. . Pp. 9–245.

See also
 Atyap chiefdom
 List of villages in Kaduna State

References

Populated places in Kaduna State
Atyap chiefdom